The Golden Bell Award for Most Popular Variety Show is a popular vote award presented at the annual Golden Bell Awards. It was introduced in 2022.

Winners

2020s

References

Popular Variety Show, Most
Golden Bell Awards, Most Popular Variety Show